Cosmosoma gaza is a moth of the family Erebidae. It was described by William Schaus in 1892. It is found in Peru.

References

gaza
Moths described in 1892